Jim Nickels (born September 10, 1947, in Hot Springs, Arkansas) is an American politician and a Democratic former member of the Arkansas House of Representatives representing District 41 from January 14, 2013, to 2015. Nickels also served from January 2009 until January 2013 in the District 43 seat.

Early life

Education
Nickels earned his BA and MA in sociology from Henderson State University and his JD from University of Arkansas School of Law.

Military service
Nickels served in the United States Army 1970–1972.

Elections
2012 Redistricted to District 41, with Representative Ed Garner running for Arkansas Senate, Nickels was unopposed for the May 22, 2012 Democratic primary and won the November 6, 2012 general election with 6,700 votes (52.0%) against Republican nominee Alan Lewis Pogue (born c. 1957), also of Sherwood.
2008 Initially in District 43, when Jeff Wood left the Legislature and left the seat open, Nickels was unopposed for the May 20, 2008 Democratic Primary and won the November 4, 2008 General election with 7,181 votes (52.3%) against Republican nominee Steven Meckfessel.
2010 Nickels was unopposed for both the May 18, 2010 Democratic Primary and the November 2, 2010 General election.

References

External links
Official page at the Arkansas House of Representatives

Jim Nickels at Ballotpedia
Jim Nickels at OpenSecrets

1947 births
Living people
Arkansas lawyers
Henderson State University alumni
Democratic Party members of the Arkansas House of Representatives
Politicians from Hot Springs, Arkansas
People from Sherwood, Arkansas
University of Arkansas School of Law alumni
University of Arkansas at Little Rock faculty
United States Army soldiers